Symphony in Two Flats is a 1930 British drama film directed by Gareth Gundrey and starring Ivor Novello, Benita Hume, Jacqueline Logan and Cyril Ritchard.  It was an adaptation of a successful 1929 West End play of the same title written by Novello. Separate versions were made for the United Kingdom and United States releases, with Jacqueline Logan replacing Benita Hume in the American version.

It was made at Elstree and Islington Studios. The film's sets were designed by Alex Vetchinsky.

Cast
 Ivor Novello as David Kennard
 Benita Hume as Lesley Fullerton (UK version)
 Jacqueline Logan as Leslie Fullerton (US version)
 Cyril Ritchard as Leo Chavasse
 Renee Clama as Elsie
 Minnie Rayner as Mabel
 Maidie Andrews as Miss Trebelly
 Clifford Heatherley as Wainwright
 Ernest A. Dagnall as Bradfield
 Alex Scott-Gatty as Doctor Mortimer
 Jack Payne as himself

References

Bibliography
Wood, Linda. British Films, 1927–1939. British Film Institute, 1986.

External links

1930 films
1930 drama films
Films directed by Gareth Gundrey
British drama films
Islington Studios films
Films shot at British International Pictures Studios
Gainsborough Pictures films
British black-and-white films
1930s English-language films
1930s British films
Films set in London
British films based on plays